The  was a DC electric multiple unit (EMU) train type operated by the private railway operator Fuji Kyuko (Fujikyu) on  limited-stop services on the Fujikyuko Line in Yamanashi Prefecture, Japan, from February 2002 until February 2016.

Design
The two three-car trains was converted from the former JR East 165 series Panorama Express Alps Joyful Train excursion set purchased by Fujikyu in 2001 following its withdrawal by JR East.

Operations

Formation
The three-car sets were formed as shown below, with car 1 at the Fujisan end.

 Car 2 had a single-arm pantograph.

Interior

History
Set 2002 was repainted into its original JR East Panorama Express Alps livery in 2013 ahead of its withdrawal.

The last remaining 2000 series set, 2001, was withdrawn after its final run on 7 February 2016. It was replaced by a new three-car Fujikyu 8500 series EMU introduced on  services.

References

Electric multiple units of Japan
Train-related introductions in 2001
1500 V DC multiple units of Japan